Christine Ghawi is a Canadian actress and singer. She is most noted for her portrayal of Céline Dion in the 2008 television film Céline, for which she won the Gemini Award for Best Actress in a Television Film or Miniseries at the 24th Gemini Awards in 2009.

References

External links

Canadian film actresses
Canadian television actresses
Canadian stage actresses
Canadian Screen Award winners
Living people
21st-century Canadian actresses
Year of birth missing (living people)